Suwannoochee Creek is a  tributary of the Suwannee River in the U.S. state of Georgia. For the lower half of its course it forms the boundary between Clinch and Echols counties.

See also
List of rivers of Georgia

References 
Restriction

USGS Hydrologic Unit Map - State of Georgia (1974)

Rivers of Georgia (U.S. state)
Tributaries of the Suwannee River
Rivers of Clinch County, Georgia
Rivers of Echols County, Georgia